Shahrul Azhar bin Ture (born 15 September 1985) is a Malaysian footballer who plays as a midfielder for the Malaysia Super League club PKNS.

Career statistics

Club

References

1985 births
Living people
Malaysian footballers
Malaysia Super League players
Sabah F.C. (Malaysia) players
PKNS F.C. players
People from Sabah
Association football midfielders